The following is a list of mayors of the city of Zaporizhzhia, Ukraine. It includes positions equivalent to mayor, such as chairperson of the Zaporizhzhia City Council's executive committee.

Mayors 

 , 1901–1911, 1916-1917
 Tikhomirov Sergey Alexandrovich, 1907
 Dmitrenko Kirill Maksimovich, 1911
 , 1921
 , 1921
 , 1921
 , 1921-1922
 , 1922-1925
 , 1922-1924
 , 1924
 , 1925
 , 1925-1927
 , 1927-1929
 , 1929-1930
 , 1930-1932
 , 1930-1933
 , 1932
 , 1932
 , 1932
 , 1932-1935
 , 1933
 , 1933
 , 1933
 , 1933
 , 1933-1936
 , 1936
 , 1935-1937
 , 1936-1937
 , 1937
 , 1937
 , 1937
 , 1937
 , 1937-1939
 , 1937-1938
 , 1938-1939
 , 1939-1940
 , 1939-1940
 , 1940-1941
 , 1940-1941
 , 1943-1946
 , 1943-1944
 , 1944-1948
 , 1946-1947
 , 1947-1950
 , 1948-1949
 , 1949-1950
 , 1950
 , 1950-1957
 , 1950-1951
 , 1951-1953
 , 1953-1961
 , 1957-1958
 , 1958-1959
 , 1959-1962
 , 1961-1971
 , 1964-1968
 , 1968-1975
 , 1971-1974
 , 1974-1987
 , 1975-1985
 , 1985-1991
 , 1987-1990
 , 1990-1991
 , 1990-1992
 , 1991
 , 1992
 , 1992-2000
 , 2000-2003
 , 2003-2010 
 , 2010-2015
 Oleksandr Sin, 2010-2015
 , 2015-2021
 Anatolii Kurtiev 2021- Nowadays

See also
 Zaporizhzhia history
 History of Zaporizhzhia (in Ukrainian)

References

This article incorporates information from the Ukrainian Wikipedia.

History of Zaporizhzhia
Zaporizhzhia